The Republic of China (ROC) competed as Chinese Taipei at the 1984 Summer Olympics in Los Angeles, California for the first time. The change in name was a result of the Nagoya Resolution, adopted by the International Olympic Committee in 1979 after the objections raised in the 1970s by the People's Republic of China (PRC) over the political status of Taiwan. The IOC restrictions over the ROC name led to the ROC boycott of the Summer Games of 1976 and 1980; the PRC boycotted the Olympic Games prior to the adoption of the resolution. The 1984 Summer Games Chinese Taipei team included 31 men and 7 women, taking part in 40 events in 12 sports. In weightlifting, athletes both from Chinese Taipei and the People's Republic of China won medals.

Medalists

Archery

Chinese Taipei entered one man and one woman in the archery competition.  Both placed 42nd in their respective divisions.

Women's Individual Competition
 Lu Jui-Chiung — 2226 points (→ 42nd place)

Men's Individual Competition
 Tu Chih-Chen — 2376 points (→ 42nd place)

Athletics

Men's Marathon
 Chen Chang-Ming
 Final — 2:29:53 (→ 56th place)

Men's Long Jump
 Lee Fu-an
 Qualification — 7.23m (→ did not advance, 20th place)

Men's High Jump
 Liu Chin-Chiang — 2.10m (→ did not advance)

Men's Javelin Throw
 Chen Hung-Yen
 Qualification — 71.48m (→ did not advance, 24th place)

Men's Decathlon 
 Ku Chin-shui
 Final Result — 7629 points (→ 16th place)
 Lee Fu-an
 Final Result — 7541 points (→ 19th place)

Women's 400m Hurdles 
 Lai Lih-Jiau
 Heat — 58.54 (→ did not advance)

Women's High Jump 
Liu Yen-Chiu
 Qualification — 1.70m (→ did not advance, 29th place)

Women's Javelin Throw 
 Lee Hui-Chen
 Qualification — 52.46m (→ did not advance)

Women's Heptathlon
 Tsai Li-Jiau
 Final Result — 5447 points (→ 18th place)

Boxing

Men's Light Flyweight (– 48 kg)
 Chung Pao-Ming
 First Round — Bye
 Second Round — Lost to Keith Mwila (KEN), RSC-2

Cycling

Two cyclists represented Chinese Taipei in 1984.

Sprint
 Lee Fu-hsiang

1000m time trial
 Lee Fu-hsiang

Individual pursuit
 Hsu Chin-te

Fencing

Two fencers, both men, represented Chinese Taipei in 1984.

Men's foil
 Lee Tai-Chung
 Tsai Shing-Hsiang

Men's épée
 Lee Tai-Chung
 Tsai Shing-Hsiang

Judo

Modern pentathlon

One male pentathlete represented Chinese Taipei in 1984.

Individual
 Chen Kung-Liang

Sailing

Shooting

Swimming

Men's 100m Freestyle 
Michael Miao
 Heat — 52.76 (→ did not advance, 30th place)

Men's 200m Freestyle
Michael Miao
 Heat — 1:55.01 (→ did not advance, 27th place)

Men's 400m Freestyle
Wu Ming-Hsun
 Heat — 4:16.49 (→ did not advance, 34th place)
Lin Chun-Hong
 Heat — 4:20.65 (→ did not advance, 35th place)

Men's 1500m Freestyle 
Wu Ming-Hsun
 Heat — 16:14.40 (→ did not advance, 23rd place)
Lin Chun-Hong
 Heat — 16:44.94 (→ did not advance, 25th place)

Men's 400m Individual Medley
Wu Ming-Hsun
 Heat — 5:02.94 (→ did not advance, 22nd place)

Women's 200m Freestyle
Wen San
 Heat — 2:05.85 (→ did not advance, 18th place)
Chang Hui-Chien
 Heat — 2:13.41 (→ did not advance, 28th place)

Women's 400m Freestyle 
Wen San
 Heat — 4:23.30
 B-Final — 4:21.61 (→ 15th place)
Chang Hui-Chien
 Heat — 4:42.47 (→ did not advance, 24th place)

Women's 800m Freestyle 
Wen San
 Heat — 9:09.73 (→ did not advance, 17th place)
Chang Hui-Chien
 Heat — 9:34.93 (→ did not advance, 20th place)

Women's 200m Butterfly
Wen San
 Heat — 2:21.10 (→ did not advance, 22nd place)
Chang Hui-Chien
 Heat — 2:24.89 (→ did not advance, 27th place)

Weightlifting

Wrestling

References

External links
Official Olympic Reports
International Olympic Committee results database

Nations at the 1984 Summer Olympics
1984
1984 in Taiwanese sport